Slovenia–Spain relations are the bilateral relations between Slovenia and Spain. Slovenia has an embassy in Madrid and three consulates in Barcelona, San Sebastián and Seville. Spain has an embassy in Ljubljana. The Spanish representation in Slovenia is exercised through the Embassy, which has the support of two Aggregators: Defense and Interior; two departments: Tourism and Economy and Commerce, all of them with residence in surrounding countries, although the Economic and Commercial Office has an Antenna in Ljubljana. There is a Cervantes Classroom under the Instituto Cervantes of Vienna. The relations of these two countries are mainly defined by their membership in both the NATO and the European Union.

Diplomatic relations 
Both countries share interests and objectives in their multilateralist vocation, in Mediterranean affairs in the matter of EU enlargement to the Balkans Western and Turkey and in the need to increase efforts to resume dialogue with Russia on crisis in Ukraine.

The efforts of the Spanish embassy in Ljubljana focus on intensifying and diversifying our relations. For this, the Spanish Presidency of the Council of the European Union was very helpful during the first half of 2010, and especially the visit of Minister of Foreign Affairs and Cooperation, José Manuel García-Margallo, to Slovenia, on 10 and 11 March 2014, the highest level since 2003 and, therefore, since the country's accession to the EU in 2004, which has meant a revitalization of bilateral relations, including the economic and commercial sphere. The visit had three aspects: multilateral, with the participation in the III Regional Seminar of the Hispanic–Moroccan Mediation Initiative in the Mediterranean; bilateral: the minister was received by the highest authorities of the state, including the prime minister, Alenka Bratušek, the president of the National Assembly, Janko Veber, the Minister of Foreign Affairs, Karl Erjavec and of the Economy, Dragonija Method; and economic, with a Hispanic–Slovenian business meeting chaired by the MAE García-Margallo and the Slovenian Ministry of Economy respectively, attended by representatives of 7 Spanish and 32 Slovenian companies.

On 8 and 9 June 2015, Karl Erjavec, Deputy Prime Minister and Minister of Foreign Affairs of Slovenia, officially visited Spain where he met with the Minister of Foreign Affairs and Cooperation Mr. García-Margallo, with the Vice President of the Government, Ms. Sáenz de Santamaría and with the President of the Senate, Mr. García Escudero. Minister Erjavec used his visit to inaugurate the new Slovenian honorary consulate in Seville.

Since the meeting in Madrid of the Secretary of State for the EU, Íñigo Méndez de Vigo, with his Slovenian counterpart, Igor Senčar, in October 2012, the bilateral consultations have been institutionalized semiannual at DG level.

Economic relations 
In 2014, Spanish exports to Slovenia amounted to 558 million euros (data reviewed in December 2015). The country represents the 54th customer of Spain.

In the period January–October 2015, Spanish exports to Slovenia have reached a value of €394 million, which represents a 4% drop compared to the same period of 2014. However, there have been notable variations in the main epigraphs

The relationship with cars, the leading sector of Spanish exports to Slovenia, reaches €131 million, a third of the total, and remains at a similar value compared to the previous year.

Cooperation 
Since 2006 Spain has contributed to International Trust Fund for Mine Action (ITF). In 2011, he contributed €70,000, which was entirely used for cleaning projects of war explosives in Lebanon. In November 2015, Spain sent various humanitarian material to Slovenia to accommodate the large number of refugees arriving in its territory.

See also 
 Foreign relations of Slovenia 
 Foreign relations of Spain

References 

 
Spain
Bilateral relations of Spain